The Magpul PDR (Personal Defense Rifle) is a prototype bullpup-style 5.56×45mm NATO carbine unveiled by Magpul Industries in 2006. Although halted in development as of 2011 it has garnered some attention, largely due to its "futuristic" appearance. The system consists of a gas-operated bullpup carbine intended to replace some submachine guns, M9 pistols and M4 carbines while still offering the rapid fire and range of an M4 carbine in an ultra compact firearm.

The PDR is one of the few personal defense weapons designed to use a standard caliber to simplify the logistics. The method of operation is a short stroke gas piston. It is striker-fired, features an ambidextrous ejection system, and ambidextrous controls.

The PDR-C (Compact) features an FN P90-style pistol grip and ergonomics offering a more compact weapon, while the PDR-D (Direct) uses a more conventional pistol grip with vertical grip (similar to a Steyr TMP) and safety nub to keep users from injuring themselves.

See also
 AAC Honey Badger PDW
 AKS-74U
 GA Personal Defense Weapon
 Mini-Beryl
 Magpul
 FN P90
 List of bullpup firearms
 List of carbines

References

External links

5.56 mm firearms
Short stroke piston firearms
Proposed weapons of the United States
Bullpup rifles
Submachine guns of the United States
Firearms articles needing expert attention